Suliqan (also Romanized as Sulīqān and Sūlīgān; also known as Amīnābād, Aminagan, Amīnāghan, and Amīn Āqān) is a village in Dashtabi-ye Gharbi Rural District, Dashtabi District, Buin Zahra County, Qazvin Province, Iran. At the 2006 census, its population was 672, in 155 families.

References 

Populated places in Buin Zahra County